Coolidge is a city in Thomas County, Georgia, United States. The population was 525 at the 2010 census.

History
Coolidge had its start in 1900 when the Tifton, Thomasville and Gulf Railway was extended to that point. The community was named after a railroad official. The Georgia General Assembly incorporated the place in 1901 as the "Town of Coolidge".

Geography

Coolidge is located at  (31.010744, -83.866594).

Demographics

As of the census of 2000, there were 552 people, 218 households, and 137 families residing in the city. The racial makeup of the city was 56.34% White, 40.94% African American, 0.18% Native American, 1.45% Asian, 1.09% from other races. Hispanic or Latino of any race were 1.81% of the population.

There were 218 households, out of which 27.1% had children under the age of 18 living with them, 42.7% were married couples living together, 18.3% had a female householder with no husband present, and 36.7% were non-families. 32.1% of all households were made up of individuals, and 20.2% had someone living alone who was 65 years of age or older. The average household size was 2.53 and the average family size was 3.27.

In the city, the population was spread out, with 26.6% under the age of 18, 8.0% from 18 to 24, 27.7% from 25 to 44, 21.2% from 45 to 64, and 16.5% who were 65 years of age or older. The median age was 37 years. For every 100 females, there were 79.8 males. For every 100 females age 18 and over, there were 71.6 males.

The median income for a household in the city was $18,750, and the median income for a family was $25,357. Males had a median income of $21,563 versus $18,068 for females. The per capita income for the city was $11,413. About 22.1% of families and 22.8% of the population were below the poverty line, including 29.4% of those under age 18 and 26.2% of those age 65 or over.

Climate
The climate in this area is characterized by relatively high temperatures and evenly distributed precipitation throughout the year.  According to the Köppen Climate Classification system, Coolidge has a humid subtropical climate, abbreviated "Cfa" on climate maps.

Notable people
Ken Terrell  - Hollywood stuntman and minor actor, born in Coolidge

Mike Keown - Former candidate for U.S. House of Representatives and current Baptist minister.

References

Cities in Georgia (U.S. state)
Cities in Thomas County, Georgia